Monosporascus cannonballus is a species of fungus in the Sordariales. It is a plant pathogen.

References

Fungal plant pathogens and diseases
Sordariales
Fungi described in 1974